Desmoncus orthacanthos is a spiny, climbing palm native to tropical South America.  Stems grow clustered together, and are 2–12 m long and 1.5–2 cm in diameter.  Stems, leaf sheaths and often leaves are covered with black spines up to 6 cm long.

Desmoncus orthacanthos is found in Colombia, Venezuela, Trinidad and Tobago, Guyana, Suriname, French Guiana, Brazil, Bolivia, Ecuador and Peru. The stems are used for basket weaving.

References

orthacanthos
Trees of Trinidad and Tobago
Trees of South America
Palms of French Guiana